The 1915–16 Cincinnati Bearcats men's basketball team represented the University of Cincinnati during the 1915–16 college men's basketball season. The head coach was George Little, coaching his third season with the Bearcats.

Schedule

|-

References

Cincinnati Bearcats men's basketball seasons
Cincinnati Bearcats men's basketball team
Cincinnati Bearcats men's basketball team
Cincinnati Bearcats men's basketball team